The Man Who Grew Tomatoes is a 1959 mystery detective novel by the British writer Gladys Mitchell. It is the thirty second in the long-running series of books featuring Mitchell's best known creation, the psychoanalyst and amateur detective Mrs Bradley.

Synopsis
When Hugh Camber inherits a Norfolk country estate following the death of his relative Paul Camber, he finds hostility and suspicion from the staff and a rival claimant. He calls in Dame Beatrice Bradley to investigate, and she is particularly intrigued by Paul's death in Scottish river while fishing for salmon and the tomatoes that he ate as his last meal.

References

Bibliography
 Magill, Frank Northen . Critical Survey of Mystery and Detective Fiction: Authors, Volume 3. Salem Press, 1988.
 Reilly, John M. Twentieth Century Crime & Mystery Writers. Springer, 2015.

1959 British novels
Novels by Gladys Mitchell
British crime novels
British mystery novels
British thriller novels
Novels set in Norfolk
Novels set in Scotland
British detective novels
Michael Joseph books